Wan Abdul Rahim bin Wan Abdullah (born 24 February 1952) is a Malaysian politician and was a former member of the Parliament of Malaysia for the Kota Bharu constituency in Kelantan from 2008 to 2013 representing the Pan-Malaysian Islamic Party (PAS) in the Pakatan Rakyat (PR) opposition coalition. However, since 2015, he has joined Parti Amanah Negara (AMANAH), a component party of the Pakatan Harapan (PH) new opposition coalition. Wan Abdul Rahim is also known popularly as Cikgu Rahim (literally means Teacher Rahim).

Wan Abdul Rahim was elected as a member of the Kelantan State Legislative Assembly (DUN) for Tanjong Mas constituency in 1995 and 1999 general elections, and served as the Assembly's Speaker (1995-2008).

In 2000, Wan Abdul Rahim urged PAS to accept female candidates for general elections, a position that was later adopted by the party in the 2004 general election.

In 2004 general election, he contested the federal constituency of Kuala Krai but lost. But he was elected to the federal seat of parliament for the Kota Bharu constituency in 2008. He initially sought to retire at the 2013 election, but instead contested the seat of Gua Musang, losing to its long-time incumbent Tengku Razaleigh Hamzah of the United Malays National Organisation (UMNO).

Controversy
On 30 April 2002, Wan Abdul Rahim was found guilty for the offence of marrying a 22-year-old Cambodian woman, Hassena Osman alias Sowan Rodi in her country on 10 March 2002 without the approval of the Kelantan State Religious Council and sentenced to three days' jail and fined RM1.800 by the Syariah Court.

Election results

Honours

Honours of Malaysia 
Wan Abdul Rahim was earlier conferred the Dato' Paduka Jiwa Mahkota Kelantan award which carry the title Dato when he was the speaker in 2004 by the previous Sultan Ismail Petra of Kelantan but the award was revoked by his son, Sultan Muhammad V in February 2018. In 2019, Wan Abdul Rahim was awarded Darjah Panguan Seri Melaka by Tuan Yang Terutama Yang Dipertua Negeri Melaka which carry the title Datuk.

  :
  (2004, revoked 7 February 2018)
  :
  Companion Class II of the Exalted Order of Malacca (DPSM) – Datuk' (2019)

References

Living people
1952 births
People from Kelantan
Members of the Dewan Rakyat
Former Malaysian Islamic Party politicians
Malaysian people of Malay descent
Malaysian Muslims
National Trust Party (Malaysia) politicians